Advanz Pharma Corp. is a multinational pharmaceutical company headquartered in London. It changed its name from Concordia Healthcare Corp. in November 2018. The company focuses on a number of therapy areas including endocrinology, ophthalmology, urology, anti-infectives, pain management, central nervous system disorders, oncology, haematology, cardiology and intensive care medicine. The company also focuses on acquiring legacy pharmaceutical compounds which are usually off-patent. The operational headquarters is in London, UK, operations centre in Mumbai, India and regional hubs in Europe, Australia and the US.

History

2021
In July 2021 the Competition and Markets Authority found that the company "exploited a loophole enabling it to reap much higher profits" and was directly fined £40.9m.  It raised the price of liothyronine tablets from £6 a pack to £248 in 2017. Its former private equity owners HgCapital and Cinven, which now form part of the company, were also fined £8.6 million and £51.9 million respectively. The company's response was that they take "competition law very seriously. We utterly disagree with the CMA’s decision on the pricing of liothyronine tablets and will be appealing. In addition, any liothyronine price increases were all pre-notified to, and agreed in advance and in writing by, the Department of Health and Social Care.”

2020
Effective January 1, 2020, Advanz Pharma  moved from Canada to Jersey with headquarters in London. In March, ADVANZ PHARMA de-listed its shares from the Toronto Stock Exchange and the company acquired Correvio Pharma Corp. for US$76 million.

2019
In January 2019 the Competition and Markets Authority altered its investigation period, saying that “the price paid by the NHS for liothyronine tablets rose from £15.15 to £258.19, a rise of 1,605%, while production costs remained broadly stable”. The company said that price increases were notified in advance and implemented only after approval from the Department of Health and Social Care.

2017
The British Competition and Markets Authority launched an investigation into the alleged “excessive and unfair pricing” of liothyronine tablets in 2017. It alleged that the company overcharged the NHS from before 2007 to July 2017. The price of a pack increased by almost 6,000% from £4.46 before it was debranded in 2007 to £258.19 by July 2017.

2016
In February 2016, Thompson transferred his entire stock holdings to an Ontario numbered company.  In March, a special committee was set up within the company to evaluate suitors for a takeover.  Each of the suitors was a private equity firm.  The company was not sold and in October 2016, the company formally ended the special committee.  During this time, Thompson, via a shares backed collateral loan, saw his shares being sold on the public market during August, September and October.

On September 15, 2016, the British Parliament proposed a new bill, the "Health Service Medical Supplies (Costs) Bill"  The bill addressed overcharging and members of Parliament specifically named AMCo It was unanimously approved October 24, 2016.

On October 21, 2016, the company announced that Mark Thompson was stepping down as CEO and chairman of the board.

2015
In March the company announced its largest acquisition to date when it agreed to buy the majority of assets of Covis Pharma Sarl and Covis Injectables Sarl for $1.2 billion in cash.  Concordia acquired eighteen drugs as part of the transaction and anticipated a 50% increase in earnings per share for the year.

In September, Concordia paid European private equity firm Cinven $3.5 billion in cash and shares for UK-based global out-of-patent prescription pharmaceuticals firm Amdipharm Mercury - sometimes abbreviated to AMCo.  The deal would "uniquely position the combined company as a leading, international pharmaceutical company with extensive geographic reach", said Concordia chief executive Mark Thompson. 2015 Year-over-year revenue growth of $289 million or an increase of 276 per cent  
Year-over-year adjusted EBITDA1 growth of $206 million or an increase of 347 per cent

2014
In January the company  completed a five-year exclusive distribution deal with Lachlan Pharma Holdings to distribute Ulesfia in the United States. In March, the company entered into a definitive agreement to acquire the irritable bowel syndrome drug, Donnatal, from Revive Pharmaceuticals for $200 million and 4,605,833 common shares of company stock. The deal was completed in May. In September the company entered into its first collaboration with Orphan Canada. In the same month the company announced it would acquire Zonegran in the United States and Puerto Rico, for $90 million.

2013
In May the company acquired Pediatric products (Kapvay, Orapred ODT & OS) from Shionogi Inc. In October the company acquired Complete Medical Homecare, then in December the company completed the takeover of Mercari Acquisition Corp. as well as Pinnacle Biologics Inc, and began trading on the Toronto stock exchange.

References

Companies formerly listed on the Toronto Stock Exchange
Pharmaceutical companies of Canada
Pharmaceutical companies established in 1963
1963 establishments in Ontario